Piton is a rock climbing tool.

Piton or Pitons may also refer to:
Piton (surname)
Piton (beer), a Pilsner beer from Saint Lucia
Piton, Mauritius, a region in Rivière du Rempart District
Piton State College, a school in Piton, Mauritius
Mons Piton, an isolated mountain on the Moon
Piton Island, Curzon Islands, Antarctica
Pitons (film), see Laila Pakalniņa#Filmography
Pitons (Saint Lucia), two mountainous volcanic plugs in Saint Lucia: Gros Piton and Petit Piton
Pitons, cirques and remparts of Reunion Island, a UNESCO World Heritage Site

See also 

Carbet Mountains, Pitons Du Carbet, Martinique
Piton de la Fournaise, a volcano in Réunion
Piton de la Petite Rivière Noire, a mountain in Mauritius
Piton des Neiges, a volcano in Réunion
Piton Sainte-Rose, a town in Réunion